Seneca is a given name and an Italian surname which may refer to:

Given name
Seneca Lassiter (born 1977), American former middle-distance runner
Seneca M. Dorr (1820–1884), American lawyer, judge, politician and President of the Vermont Senate
Seneca Paige (1788–1856), American-born businessman and political figure in Canada East
Seneca Ray Stoddard (1844–1917), American landscape photographer
Seneca Wallace (born 1980), American National Football League quarterback

In fiction
Seneca Beaulac, from the American daytime soap opera Ryan's Hope
Seneca Crane, in The Hunger Games novel by Suzanne Collins and the film adaptation

Surname
Seneca the Elder (54 BC – 39 AD), Roman orator and writer, father of the Stoic philosopher Seneca
Seneca the Younger (c. 4 BC – AD 65), Roman Stoic philosopher, statesman, and dramatist
Isaac Seneca (1874–1945), American football halfback, first Native American selected All-American
Joe Seneca (1919-1996), American actor and songwriter
Robert Seneca (died 1931), American politician and merchant